Leptobrachium liui, the Chong'an moustache toad or Pope's spiny toad, is a species of frog in the family Megophryidae.

It is endemic to southern and southeastern China.
Its natural habitats are subtropical or tropical moist lowland forests, subtropical or tropical moist montane forests, and rivers. It is threatened by habitat loss.

References

liui
Amphibians of China
Endemic fauna of China
Taxa named by Clifford H. Pope
Amphibians described in 1947
Taxonomy articles created by Polbot